Willie Joyner (born April 2, 1962) is a former American football running back in the National Football League who played for the Houston Oilers. He played college football for the Maryland Terrapins.

References

1962 births
Living people
American football running backs
Houston Oilers players
Maryland Terrapins football players